Charles Campbell (1843–1919) was a Queensland politician and a Member of the Queensland Legislative Council. He was regarded as the "father of local government in Queensland".

Early life
Charles Campbell was born about 1843 at Cook's River near Petersham, Sydney, the son of Hugh Campbell and his wife Helen White (née Fraser). He arrived on the Darling Downs, Queensland with his brother in 1864 and pursued pastoral pursuits. He married Margaret Corr on 4 November 1873 in Queensland.

Political life
Charles Campbell was a member of the Jondaryan Divisional Board since its inception in 1879 and was its chairman for 25 years, which was regarded as one of the best managed in the state.

He was also a member of the Toowoomba City Council and was at one time its mayor.

On 3 July 1914 Charles Campbell was appointed to the Queensland Legislative Council for life, terminating with his death on 18 March 1919.

Later life
Charles Campbell died on 18 March 1919 at his residence in Campbell Street, Toowoomba. He was buried in the Presbyterian section of Drayton and Toowoomba Cemetery on 19 March 1919.

References

Members of the Queensland Legislative Council
1843 births
1919 deaths
Burials in Drayton and Toowoomba Cemetery